Paternalism is action that limits a person's or group's liberty or autonomy and is intended to promote their own good. Paternalism can also imply that the behavior is against or regardless of the will of a person, or also that the behavior expresses an attitude of superiority. Paternalism, paternalistic and paternalist have all been used as a pejorative for example in the context of societal and/or political realms and references.

Some such as John Stuart Mill think paternalism to be appropriate towards children, saying:

Paternalism towards adults is sometimes thought of as treating them as if they were children.

Etymology

The word paternalism derives from the adjective paternal, which entered the English language in the 15th century from Old French paternel (cf. Old Occitan paternal, as in Catalan, Spanish and Portuguese), itself from Medieval Latin paternalis. The classical Latin equivalent was paternus "fatherly", from pater "father".

Types

Soft and hard

Soft paternalism is the view that paternalism is justified only if an action to be committed is involuntary. John Stuart Mill gives the example of a person about to walk across a damaged bridge. One cannot tell the person the bridge is damaged as he does not speak our language. According to soft paternalism, one would be justified in forcing him to not cross the bridge so one could find out whether he knows about the damage. If he knows and wants to jump off the bridge and commit suicide then one should allow him to. Hard paternalists say that at least sometimes one is entitled to prevent him from crossing the bridge and committing suicide.

Pure and impure

Pure paternalism is paternalism where the person(s) having their liberty or autonomy taken away are those being protected. Impure paternalism occurs when the class of people whose liberty or autonomy is violated by some measure is wider than the group of persons thereby protected.

Moral and welfare

Moral paternalism is where paternalism is justified to promote the moral well-being of a person(s) even if their welfare would not improve. For example, it could be argued that someone should be prevented from prostitution even if they make a decent living off it and their health is protected. A moral paternalist would argue that it is ethical considering they believe prostitution to be morally corrupting.

Criteria for effective paternalism

Thomas Pogge argues that there are a number of criteria for paternalism.
 The concept should work within human flourishing. Generally accepted items such as nutrition, clothing, shelter, certain basic freedoms may be acceptable by a range of religious and social backgrounds.
 The criteria should be minimally intrusive.
 The requirements of the criteria should not be understood as exhaustive; leaving societies the ability to modify the criteria based on their own needs.
 The supplementary considerations introduced by such more ambitious criteria of justice must not be allowed to outweigh the modest considerations.

Opponents

In his Two Treatises of Government, John Locke argues (against Robert Filmer) that political and paternal power are not the same.

John Stuart Mill opposes state paternalism on the grounds that individuals know their own good better than the state does, that the moral equality of persons demands respect for others' liberty, and that paternalism disrupts the development of an independent character. In On Liberty, he writes:

Mill, however, disregards his own analysis when it comes to colonial subjects.  In On Liberty, he writes:

Mill above declares barbarians to be in need of paternalism. But he narrowly defines barbarism historically, geographically, and economically insofar as to declare it fit to describe the people he intends to describe as such.

Contemporary opponents of paternalism often appeal to the ideal of personal autonomy.

In society

 In the Southern United States before the Civil War, paternalism was a concept used to justify the legitimacy of slavery. Women would present themselves as mothers for the slaves, or protectors that provided benefits the slaves would not get on their own. Plantation mistresses would attempt to civilize their workers by providing food, shelter, and affection. These women would justify that the conditions for freed blacks were poorer than those who were under the mistresses' protection. Paternalism was used as an argument against the emancipation of slavery due to these mistresses providing better living conditions than the enslaved's counterpart in the factory-based north. As a result of this conclusion, the whites would often manage basic rights of the enslaved such as child rearing and property.
 Paternalism was also used against women's suffrage, with opponents of women's suffrage saying that granting women the right to vote would make their lives harder and separate them from their families.

Paternalism and slavery

A concept of paternalism functioned as a tool of justification during the slavery era, and the concept promoted the institution of the slavery. Masters, who were the owners of slaves, believed themselves that the concept of paternalism can justify their wrongdoings such as trading of slaves and punishment of their slaves. The masters believed that they are helping and rescuing slaves from poor conditions; therefore, the masters believed themselves as parent or savior of their slaves. Masters used the concept of paternalism to show that their behavior is not wrong or unethical. Not only by the masters, but slaves also exploited the concept of paternalism for their own benefit. For instance, slaves believed that enslavement would be better than the freedom. Slaves believed that they would be treated better as long as they build good relationship with their masters. Slaves also believed that they could get basic human needs such as food from their masters. Thus, the concept of paternalism for slaves was the tool that made slaves feel more comfortable and free. Walter Johnson introduces a concept of paternalism in Soul by Soul: Life Inside the Antebellum Slave Market that mentions "Slave-market paternalism thus replayed the plots of proslavery propaganda and fiction: the good hearted slave at the side of the dying master; the slave who could be trusted to master himself; the slaveholder's saving interventions in the life of the unfortunate slave". Even though slaves could benefit from the concept of paternalism by receiving abundant food and medical care, the concept can never justify the institution of slavery.

See also

 Adultism
 Authoritarianism
 Noble lie
 Obscurantism
 Paternalistic conservatism
 Rule according to higher law
 Social conservatism

References

Further reading

 Mill and Paternalism, by Gregory Claeys. Cambridge University Press, 2013 
 Counting the Dragon's Teeth and Claws: The Definition of Hard Paternalism by Thaddeus Mason Pope.  From 20 Georgia State University Law Review 659–722 (2004)
 Monstrous Impersonation: A Critique of Consent-Based Justifications for Hard Paternalism by Thaddeus Mason Pope.  From 73 UMKC Law Review 681–713 (2005)
 Is Public Health Paternalism Really Never Justified? A Response to Joel Feinberg by Thaddeus Mason Pope.  From 30 Oklahoma City University Law Review 121–207 (2005)
 Paternalism, by Peter Suber. From Philosophy of Law: An Encyclopedia, edited by Christopher Berry Gray, Garland Pub. Co., 1999, vol. II, pp. 632–635
 

Family
Ageism
Virtue ethics
Political theories
Theories of law